Piano Piano Kid is a 1991 Turkish drama film directed by Tunç Başaran. The film was selected as the Turkish entry for the Best Foreign Language Film at the 65th Academy Awards, but was not accepted as a nominee.

Cast
 Rutkay Aziz as Kerim
 Emin Sivas as Kemal
 Serap Aksoy as Kamile
 Yaman Okay as Hizir
 Aysegul Ünsa as Feriha

See also
 List of submissions to the 65th Academy Awards for Best Foreign Language Film
 List of Turkish submissions for the Academy Award for Best Foreign Language Film

References

External links
 

1991 films
1991 drama films
Turkish drama films
1990s Turkish-language films